Elthorne may refer to:

Elthorne (hundred)
Elthorne (ward)

See also 

 Elthorne Park (disambiguation)